Marina Central or Marina Centre (Chinese: 滨海中心) is a zone of reclaimed land within the Downtown Core in the southern part of Singapore. Together with the Marina South area, it encloses the sheltered Marina Bay.

Suntec City, Marina Square, Millenia Walk, Esplanade – Theatres on the Bay and South Beach Tower are located within Marina Central.

Hotels
 Marina Mandarin Singapore - managed by Meritus Hotels & Resorts
 Mandarin Oriental Singapore - formerly The Oriental Singapore
 The Pan Pacific Singapore
 Raffles Hotel Singapore
 Fairmont Singapore - formerly Raffles The Plaza, prior to that Westin Plaza
 Swissotel The Stamford - formerly Westin Stamford
 The Ritz-Carlton Millenia Singapore
 Conrad Centennial Singapore
 JW Marriott Hotel Singapore South Beach
 The Capitol Kempinski Hotel Singapore

Shopping malls
 Marina Square
 Suntec City Mall
 CityLink Mall
 Raffles City Shopping Centre

See also
 Millenia Singapore

References

 
Places in Singapore
Downtown Core (Singapore)
Shopping districts and streets in Singapore